Mister Roberts is an American sitcom that aired on NBC from September 17, 1965 to September 2, 1966. Based on the best selling 1946 novel, 1948 play, and the 1955 film of the same name, the series stars Roger Smith in the title role and Richard X. Slattery as the ship's captain.

Synopsis
Set during World War II, the series chronicled the adventures of the crew of the USS Reluctant AK-601 cargo ship. Produced by Warner Bros. Television, Mister Roberts was executive produced by William T. Orr. The series' theme song was composed by Frank Perkins.

Lieutenant Roberts found life on a cargo ship monotonous, and he wanted to get transferred to another ship so he could participate more fully in the war effort. Ensign Pulver was constantly trying to liven up the ship's routine, and most of the crew were looking for ways to drive stern Captain Morton out of his mind.  

Featuring a cast of Warner Bros. Television stars and unknowns, the series aired on Fridays at 9:30 and was canceled after its first season due to low ratings.

Cast
 Roger Smith as Lieutenant Douglas Roberts
 Steve Harmon as Ensign Frank Pulver
 George Ives as Doc
 Ray Reese as Seaman Reber
 Richard Sinatra as Seaman D'Angelo
 Richard X. Slattery as Captain John Morton
 Ronald Starr as Seaman Mannion

Episodes

Season One (1965-66)

References

External links

 

1965 American television series debuts
1966 American television series endings
1960s American sitcoms
Military comedy television series
Live action television shows based on films
Television shows based on American novels
Television series based on plays
Television series by Warner Bros. Television Studios
World War II television comedy series
Nautical television series